The Breeders' Futurity Stakes is an American Grade I Thoroughbred horse race held annually in early October at Keeneland Race Course in Lexington, Kentucky. Currently offering a purse of $500,000, the race is open to two-year-old horses and is run at a distance of one and one-sixteenth miles on the dirt. From 1997 to 2008, the race was sponsored by Lane's End Farm. From 2009 to 2013 it was sponsored by Dixiana Farm. It is now sponsored by Claiborne Farm.

Structure 
The race is a Road to the Kentucky Derby Prep Season qualifying race.  The winner receives 10 points toward qualifying for the Kentucky Derby. It is also currently part of the Breeders' Cup Challenge series.  The winner automatically qualifies for the Breeders' Cup Juvenile.

History 
The Breeders' Futurity was first raced at the Kentucky Association track in Lexington in 1910 and was renewed each year thereafter through 1930. In 1931 through 1935, the race was shifted to the Latonia Race Track in Covington, Kentucky. The Futurity was revived at Keeneland in the fall of 1938 and during World War II, from 1943 through 1945 was renewed as part of the Churchill Downs fall meetings.

The race was a Grade III event from 1973 to 1975, a Grade II from 1976 through 2003, and became a Grade 1 stakes in 2004. Over the years, it has been raced at various distances:
 Six furlongs (1938–1949)
 Seven furlongs (1950–1955)
 Seven furlongs, 184 feet (1956–1980)
  miles (1981–present)

From 2006 to 2013, the race was run on a Polytrack artificial dirt surface. In 2014, the Polytrack was replaced by a new dirt surface.

Records (since 1938)
Fastest Time: (at Current Distance  miles)
 1:42.20 – Polar Expedition (1993)

Most wins by an owner
 5 – Claiborne Farm (1956, 1963, 1968, 1983, 1987)

Most wins by a jockey
 5 – Don Brumfield (1969, 1970, 1972, 1974, 1979)

Most wins by a trainer
 6 –  D. Wayne Lukas (1991, 1992, 1995, 1996, 1998, 2004)

Winners of the Breeders' Futurity Stakes since 1938

Earlier winners

1937: No race
1936: No race
1935: No race
1934: No race
1933: Mata Hari
1932: Technique
1931: The Bull
1930: Mate
1929: Gallant Knight
1928: Current
1927: Wacker Drive
1926: Wood Lore
1925: Flight of Time
1924: Candy Kid
1923: Worthmore
1922: Donges
1921: Gentility
1920: Believe Idle Hour
1919: Blazes
1918: Colonel Livingston
1917: Escoba
1916: Harry Kelly
1915: Kinney
1914: Luke
1913: Imperator
1912: Helios
1911: The Manager
1910: Housemaid

See also
Road to the Kentucky Derby

References

1910 establishments in Kentucky
Keeneland horse races
Flat horse races for two-year-olds
Breeders' Cup Challenge series
Grade 1 stakes races in the United States
Graded stakes races in the United States
Recurring sporting events established in 1910